Yarrabandai Creek is a Creek in New South Wales. The creek starts at an elevation of 289m at an elevation of 254m and flows over  near the town of Trundle, New South Wales.
It is also the name of a nearby Railway Station on the Broken Hill railway line.

References

Rivers of New South Wales